Jan Bakelants (born 14 February 1986) is a Belgian former professional road racing cyclist, who competed as a professional from 2009 to 2022.

Career

His major wins include the 2008 Tour de l'Avenir and stage 2 of the 2013 Tour de France, claiming the yellow jersey after winning the stage by only a second of an advantage on the peloton after a late attack. He also rode the 2010 Giro d'Italia, in which he finished 36th.

Bakelants left  at the end of the 2013 season, and joined  for the 2014 season. In August 2014, it was announced that he would be leaving  after one year and joining  on an initial two-year deal.

Bakelants was severely injured in a crash at the 2017 Giro di Lombardia when he crashed into a ravine on a fast descent, fracturing seven ribs and the first and third vertebrae. He did not lose consciousness and was transferred to the hospital in Como. The crash left Bakelants  shorter. After his crash, Bakelants spoke out about safety standards in cycling. He hoped to return to racing in March 2018, and did so at the Classic Loire Atlantique in France.

Major results

2006
 10th Liège–Bastogne–Liège Espoirs
2007
 3rd Paris–Tours Espoirs
2008
 1st  Overall Tour de l'Avenir
1st Stage 6
 1st  Overall Circuit des Ardennes
 1st  Overall Tour de Liège
 1st Liège–Bastogne–Liège Espoirs
 1st Flèche Ardennaise
 2nd Overall Le Triptyque des Monts et Châteaux
 2nd Grand Prix de Waregem
 3rd Road race, National Under-23 Road Championships
 4th Overall Tour des Pyrénées
 4th Circuit de Wallonie
 8th Overall Circuit Franco-Belge
 9th Overall Giro delle Regioni
2009
 2nd GP Triberg-Schwarzwald
 5th De Vlaamse Pijl
 7th Le Samyn
 9th Overall Eneco Tour
 10th Overall Tour of Belgium
 10th Overall Ster Elektrotoer
2010
 6th Overall Tour de Wallonie
 7th Trofeo Inca
 10th Clásica de Almería
2012
 4th Road race, National Road Championships
 5th Grand Prix de Wallonie
 6th Overall Tour Down Under
 6th Overall Circuit de la Sarthe
 10th Overall Eneco Tour
2013
 1st Grand Prix de Wallonie
 Tour de France
1st Stage 2
Held  after Stages 2 & 3
 2nd Amstel Curaçao Race
 National Road Championships
3rd Road race
4th Time trial
 3rd Overall Tour de Luxembourg
 4th Overall Eneco Tour
 4th Grand Prix of Aargau Canton
 7th Overall Tour of Beijing
 10th Grand Prix Cycliste de Montréal
2014
 1st Stage 6 Critérium du Dauphiné
 3rd Grand Prix de Wallonie
 7th La Drôme Classic
2015
 1st Giro dell'Emilia
 1st Gran Piemonte
 2nd Grand Prix de Wallonie
 4th Grand Prix Cycliste de Montréal
 6th Overall Critérium International
 7th Overall Circuit de la Sarthe
 7th Coppa Sabatini
2016
 2nd La Drôme Classic
 3rd Overall La Méditerranéenne
1st  Points classification
1st Stage 4
 5th Giro dell'Emilia
 6th Coppa Sabatini
 8th Overall Tour La Provence
 9th Classic Sud-Ardèche
2017
 3rd La Drôme Classic
 4th Grand Prix Cycliste de Montréal
 5th Grand Prix de Wallonie
2018
 6th Grand Prix Pino Cerami
2019
 5th Overall ZLM Tour
2020
 4th Road race, National Road Championships
 6th Overall Tour de Luxembourg
 9th Trofeo Matteotti
2022
 1st Stage 5 Tour de Wallonie

Grand Tour results timeline

References

External links
 

1986 births
Living people
Belgian male cyclists
People from Oudenaarde
Belgian Tour de France stage winners
2013 Tour de France stage winners
Cyclists from East Flanders